The 2022–23 UEFA Youth League UEFA Champions League Path (group stage) began on 6 September and concluded on 2 November 2022. A total of 32 teams competed in the group stage of the UEFA Champions League Path to decide 16 of the 24 places in the knockout phase (play-offs and the round of 16 onwards) of the 2022–23 UEFA Youth League.

Draw 
The youth teams of the 32 clubs which qualified for the 2022–23 UEFA Champions League group stage entered the UEFA Champions League Path. If there was a vacancy (youth teams not entering), it was filled by a team defined by UEFA.

For the UEFA Champions League Path, the 32 teams were drawn into eight groups of four. There was no separate draw held, with the group compositions identical to the draw for the 2022–23 UEFA Champions League group stage, which was held on 25 August 2022, 18:00 CEST (19:00 TRT), in Istanbul, Turkey.

Format 
In each group, teams played against each other home-and-away in a round-robin format. The group winners advanced to the round of 16, while the eight runners-up advanced to the play-offs, where they would be joined by the eight second round winners from the Domestic Champions Path.

Tiebreakers 
Teams were ranked according to points (3 points for a win, 1 point for a draw, 0 points for a loss). If two or more teams were tied on points, the following tiebreaking criteria were applied, in the order given, to determine the rankings (see Article 14 Group formation and match system – group stage, Regulations of the UEFA Youth League):

 Points in head-to-head matches among the tied teams;
 Goal difference in head-to-head matches among the tied teams;
 Goals scored in head-to-head matches among the tied teams;
 If more than two teams were tied, and after applying all head-to-head criteria above, a subset of teams are still tied, all head-to-head criteria above are reapplied exclusively to this subset of teams;
 Goal difference in all group matches;
 Goals scored in all group matches;
 Away goals scored in all group matches;
 Wins in all group matches;
 Away wins in all group matches;
 Disciplinary points (direct red card = 3 points; double yellow card = 3 points; single yellow card = 1 point);
 Drawing of lots.

Groups 
Times are CET/CEST, as listed by UEFA (local times, if different, are in parentheses).

Group A

Group B

Group C

Group D

Group E

Group F

Group G

Group H

Notes

References

External links

UEFA Youth League Matches: 2022–23, UEFA.com

1
September 2022 sports events in Europe
October 2022 sports events in Europe
November 2022 sports events in Europe